The 2019 Shymkent Challenger II was a professional tennis tournament played on clay courts. It was the fourth edition of the tournament which was part of the 2019 ATP Challenger Tour. It took place in Shymkent, Kazakhstan between 10 and 16 June 2019.

Singles main-draw entrants

Seeds

 1 Rankings are as of 27 May 2019.

Other entrants
The following players received wildcards into the singles main draw:
  Sergey Fomin
  Andrey Golubev
  Ergi Kırkın
  Timofei Skatov
  Dostanbek Tashbulatov

The following players received entry into the singles main draw as alternates:
  Gonzalo Escobar
  Vladyslav Manafov
  Ante Pavić
  Wu Di

The following players received entry into the singles main draw using their ITF World Tennis Ranking:
  Riccardo Bonadio
  Baptiste Crepatte
  Sanjar Fayziev
  Konstantin Kravchuk
  Skander Mansouri

The following players received entry from the qualifying draw:
  Sebastian Korda
  Alejandro Tabilo

The following players received entry as lucky losers:
  Alexandar Lazarov
  Grigoriy Lomakin

Champions

Singles

 Andrej Martin def.  Stefano Travaglia 6–4, 6–4.

Doubles

 Nikola Čačić /  Yang Tsung-hua def.  André Göransson /  Marc-Andrea Hüsler 6–4, 6–4.

References

2019 ATP Challenger Tour
2019
2019 in Kazakhstani sport
June 2019 sports events in Asia